Dervaig is a small village on the Isle of Mull off the west coast of Scotland. The village is within the parish of Kilninian and Kilmore, and is situated on the B8073. In 1961 it had a population of 82.

The church is by Glasgow architect Peter MacGregor Chalmers with stained glass by Stephen Adam.

References

External links

Canmore - Mull, Cnoc Fada, Dervaig site record
Canmore - Mull, Dervaig, Kilmore Parish Church site record

Villages on the Isle of Mull